The Gap is the fifth studio album by Bryn Haworth.

The album was recorded with the backing musicians from the Eric Clapton Band - Dave Markee, Chris Stainton, Henry Spinetti and Bruce Rowland. It was later released in the US on the Star Song label (SSR—0037) in a different cover, with the "Larry Norman Presents" tag.

Track listing
All tracks composed by Bryn Haworth; except where indicated
 "The Gap"
 "Egypt"
 "I Can Do All Things"
 "New World Coming"
 "It Would Have Been Me"
 "Power of the Holy Spirit"
 "More of You"
 "New Jerusalem" (Haworth, Dave Markee)
 "No Time"
 "Send Down the Rain" (Haworth, Gordon Haskell)

Personnel
 Bryn Haworth - guitar, mandolin, harpolek, vocals
 Henry Spinetti - drums
 Dave Markee - bass, mandocello
 Chris Stainton - keyboards
 Bruce Rowland - percussion
Technical
Bryn Haworth, Dave Markee - producer
Paul Cobbold - engineer

The album was digitally re-mastered and re-released in July 2008 on Chapel Lane Records (KMCD 854).

References

1980 albums
Bryn Haworth albums